Butterfly on the Shoulder (or Un papillon sur l'épaule) is a French drama, thriller film directed by Jacques Deray.

Plot
When he stops in Barcelona (Catalonia) with his wife for a week, Roland Fériaud discovered in his hotel a man in agony before being knocked out. He wakes up in a mental hospital where he questions the insistently on a mysterious briefcase that he has no memory ...

Cast

 Lino Ventura : Roland Fériaud
 Paul Crauchet : Raphaël
 Nicole Garcia : Sonia
 Jean Bouise : Dr. Bavier
 Laura Betti : Madame Carrabo
 Xavier Depraz : Miguel Carrabo
 Jacques Maury : Goma
 Dominique Lavanant : The Young Woman
 José Lifante : The Commissioner
 Claudine Auger : The coat's woman
 Roland Bertin : The Official

Accolades

References

External links

1978 films
French thriller drama films
1970s thriller drama films
1978 drama films
Films scored by Claude Bolling
Films set in Barcelona
Films set in psychiatric hospitals
1970s French-language films
1970s French films